Food shortage or food scarcity may refer to:
 Famine, extreme scarcity of food
 Food security, or lack thereof
 Economic shortage, demand for a product or service exceeds its supply in a market
 Food shortage conspiracy theory, a conspiracy theory that claims of an incoming famine